The Green Cove Springs Historic District is a U.S. historic district (designated as such on March 28, 1991) located in Green Cove Springs, Florida. The district is bounded by Bay Street, CSX RR tracks, Center Street, Orange Avenue, St. Elmo Street and St. Johns Road. It contains 78 historic buildings and 1 structure.

References

External links
 Clay County listings at National Register of Historic Places

National Register of Historic Places in Clay County, Florida
Historic districts on the National Register of Historic Places in Florida